The African and Malagasy Union (AMU) was an intergovernmental organization created to promote cooperation among newly independent states in Francophone Africa. The organization derives its name from the name of the continent of Africa and from the former Malagasy Republic, now Madagascar. The organization disbanded in 1985.

History
The organization was founded on 12 September 1961 in Antananarivo by members of the Brazzaville Group of French-Speaking States developing out of a meeting held in Brazzaville in December 1960. Twelve francophone countries agreed to maintain close relationships but also a special relationship with the former colonial power, France. The original aims were both economic and political: to adopt common stands on international issues, to promote economic and culture cooperation, and to maintain a common defense organization. However, this caused a problem: the organization would have to depend on France. The diversity, geography, and post-colonial problems of the different countries stopped the organization from ever becoming significant.

In March 1964 the UAM changed its name to the Afro-Malagasy Union for Economic Cooperation (Union Africaine et Malgache de Coopération Économique; UAMCE). Moktar Ould Daddah was elected as the president of the organisation while the city of Yaoundé was selected as the headquarters seat. Subsequently, it confined itself to economic affairs and by 1966 had become inactive.

The African and Malagasy Common Organization (Organization Commune Africaine et Malgache; OCAM) was the successor to the UAMCE. It was set up at Nouakchott in February 1965 and comprised the original 12 members of the UAM with the addition of Togo. In May 1965 its membership was increased by the admission of the former Belgian colonies of Congo (Kinshasa) and Rwanda. In June 1965, however, Mauritania withdrew. The remaining 14 then signed the new OCAM charter on 27 June at a meeting in Antananarivo, Madagascar. The aims of the organization were economic, social, technical, and cultural cooperation. OCAM dropped the political and defense objectives that its predecessor, the UAM, had attempted to embrace. It created the structures of an international organization: a Conference of Heads of State and Government, a Council of Ministers, a Secretariat and Secretary-General, and established its headquarters at Bangui in the Central African Republic. It developed a number of joint services and of these the most successful and most well known is the multinational airline Air Afrique. In 1979 the airline was separated from OCAM.

The organization's later history became increasingly troubled. Mauritius joined in 1970. Congo (Kinshasa), by then renamed Zaire, withdrew in 1972; Congo (Brazzaville) in 1973; Cameroon, Chad and Madagascar in 1974; Gabon in 1977. However, some of these countries retained their links with OCAM's various agencies. In 1982 OCAM held a summit at Abidjan, Côte d'Ivoire; it had then changed its name, though only to substitute Mauritius for Madagascar, to Organization Commune Africaine et Mauricienne. OCAM, also, has ceased to operate. The organization officially became extinct in 1985.

Member states
Founding members:
  (withdrew 1974)
 (withdrew 1974)
 (withdrew 1973)
 (later )
 (withdrew 1977)
 (later )
 (withdrew 1965)

 Malagasy Republic (later Madagascar) (withdrew 1974)

Joined February 1965:

Joined May 1965:
 (later ) (withdrew 1972)

Joined 1970:

References

International organizations based in Africa
International economic organizations
Defunct intergovernmental organizations
Defunct organizations based in Africa
1961 establishments in Madagascar
1985 disestablishments in Africa
Organizations established in 1961
Organizations disestablished in 1985